Anse-à-l'Orme (known as Sainte-Anne-de-Bellevue during development) is a planned Réseau express métropolitain (REM) station in the city of Sainte-Anne-de-Bellevue, Quebec, Canada. It is planned to be operated by CDPQ Infra and serves as the terminal station of the Anse-à-l'Orme branch of the REM, with an expected opening in the second quarter of 2024.

It will be located near two important educational institutions, John Abbott College and the Macdonald Campus of McGill University, which will be connected via a shuttle bus. It is also located near L'Anse-à-l'Orme Nature Park

References

Réseau express métropolitain railway stations
Sainte-Anne-de-Bellevue, Quebec
Railway stations in Montreal
Railway stations scheduled to open in 2024